Ernst Albrecht may refer to:
Ernst Albrecht (footballer) (1907–1976), German association footballer, played for Fortuna Düsseldorf and the national team
Ernst Albrecht (politician, born 1914) (1914–1991), German politician, CDU
Ernst Albrecht (politician, born 1930) (1930–2014), German politician, CDU, Premier of the state of Lower Saxony from 1976 to 1990
Ernst H. Albrecht (1906–1982), German art director